Miss Earth Venezuela 2005, or Sambil Models Caracas 2005, was held in Caracas, Venezuela, on June 1, 2005 in the Hard Rock Cafe Caracas. The winner was the model Alexandra Braun, and competed in the Miss Earth 2005 beauty pageant, in the Philippines, on October 23, 2005, when she won the first crown for Venezuela. She also won the special prize Best in Swimsuit.

Results
Sambil Models Caracas / Miss Earth Venezuela 2005: Alexandra Braun
1st Runner-up: Shannon de Lima
2nd Runner-up: María Escalante
3rd Runner-up: Myriam Abreu
4th Runner-up: Susana Girardi

Awards
Miss Internet: Alexandra Braun
Miss Press: Alexandra Braun
Miss Popularity: Stephanie Salazar
Best Body: María Escalante
Best Legs: Dayana Domínguez
Most Beautiful Eyes: Susana Girardi
Most Beautiful Face: Natalia Barrantes
Most Beautiful Hair: Leonela Castro

Contestants

 Alexandra Braun 
 Ana Mazzocca 
 Daniela Angarita 
 Dayana Domínguez 
 Gabriela Carrascal
 Johanna Vargas 
 Leonela Castro
 Lorena Loera
 María Escalante 
 Myriam Abreu
 Natalia Barrantes 
 Shannon de Lima 
 Stephanie Salazar 
 Susana Girardi 
 Yogheisa Adrián

References

External links
 Miss Earth / Sambil Model Venezuela Official Website
 Miss Earth Official Page

Miss Earth Venezuela
2005 beauty pageants
2005 in Venezuela